LBI can refer to:

 LBi, a Netherlands-based marketing agency
 Leo Baeck Institute, New York City
 Little Barrier Island, an island off the northeastern coast of New Zealand's North Island
 Little Bay Islands, Newfoundland and Labrador, Canada
 Liberman Broadcasting, American media company catering to Hispanics
 Living Bibles International
 London Borough of Islington
 Long-baseline interferometry
 Long Beach Island, Ocean County, New Jersey, U.S.
 Lucy Burns Institute
 Lutheran Bible Institute, now Golden Valley Lutheran College, St. Paul, Minnesota, U.S.